The phrase "Small Giant" may refer to:

 the Small Giant Clam, a species of saltwater bivalve
 The Small Giant, a cartoon series
 Small Giant Games, a mobile game company
 a character in Haikyū!!